Mbaise is a region in Imo State in southeastern Nigeria. In the heart of Igboland, the region includes several towns and cities. It is a group of indigenous clans, connected by intermarriage. With a population density of over 1,000 people per square kilometer, Mbaise is West Africa's most densely-populated area; its 2006 population was 611,204.

The name "Mbaise" was derived from five clans: Agbaja, Ahiara, Ekwereazu, Ezi na Ihite and Oke Uvuru.

History
Mbaise came under British rule in 1902 during the Anglo-Aro War, when the British Aro Expeditionary Force subdued the Aro Confederacy in Owerri and Mbaise. By 1906, at the conclusion of the operation, present-day Mbaise was united under British control with some local autonomy.

To supervise the clans, a native court was established in Obohia in 1907 and transferred to Nguru in 1909. In 1929, the Nguru court was destroyed as a result of the Igbo Women's War. Regional courts were then opened in Obohia, Itu, Ife and Enyiogogu in response to the home rule movement of the 1930s. The region was united as a political and administrative unit in 1941. Councils were formed by 1945, loosely based on autonomous communities. It was from councils that The three local Governments were created from the councils. Ahiazu Mbaise was a merger of the Ahiara and Ekwerazu councils, and Aboh Mbaise was a merger of the Oke-Ovoro and Agbaja councils. Ezinihitte Mbaise remained by itself except for Isu Obiangwu and Umuohiagu, two small villages which joined the Ngor-Okpala from the Agbaja region.

Until Europeans arrived in Nigeria, Mbaise's main source of income was subsistence agriculture. In Igboland, government was based on kinship and customs. The village group (a weekly gathering of men) was the highest level of organization, with the amala in power. The aladimma currently exercises power. Chinua Achebe described pre-colonial life in his novel, Things Fall Apart.

When the British colonial administration was introduced in the Southern Protectorate of Nigeria, the government established a native court at Nkwogwu Nguru in 1905 and built a residence for the British there. Dr. Rogers Stewart, who took a wrong turn on his bicycle, was captured and killed in a case of mistaken identity. The 1906 Ahiara Punitive Expedition, led by Captains Brian Douglas and Harold Hastings, began reprisals in the region.

In 1927, the colonial government introduced taxation. Taxes were increased in 1929, and the Women's War began to protest social and economic oppression. The native court at Nkwogwu was destroyed and the governor's residence was sacked. Courts were established in Itu (for Ezinihitte); Afor Enyiogugu (for Agbaja); Obohia (for Ekwerazu); Orie-Ahiara (for Ahiara); and Uvuru (for Oke-Uvuru).

On June 12, 1941, Mbaise became a federation of five clans: the Agbaja (Nguru, Okwuato, Enyiogugu, Obiangwu, and Umuohiagu), Ekwerazu, Ahiara, Ezinihitte, and Oke-Uvuru. A treasury was opened in Enyiogugu in 1942, and was transferred to Aboh in 1948. Obiangwu and Umuohiagu, which had been parts of Agbaja, joined Ngor Okpala in 1957. Mbaise now had three local governments: Ahiazu, Aboh-Mbaise, and Ezinihitte. Between 1955 and 1958, the Mbaise County Council began two landmark development projects: Mbaise Secondary School and Mbaise Joint Hospital (now General Hospital), both in Aboh.

Culture and demographics
The people are predominantly Igbo.  About 55 percent are Catholics, 35 percent are Protestants and other religions make up the remainder. Some cultural and traditional ceremonies have survived Western influence. The eight-day Ahianjoku festival honored the yam deity; since 1946, the annual August 15 new-yam festival has been a Christian version of the Ahianjoku festival. Oji Ezinihitte celebrates the Ezinihitte on January 1 each year. Itu Aka, before the farming season, encourages the people to weather the environment, modernity and new challenges. A local salad, ugba, is served with raffia wine. Mbaise women are noted for their fertility. To be an eghu ukwu, a woman must bear at least 10 children; some women have given birth to as many as 15.

Mbaise culture is rich in music and Igbo dance. Music is played on the wood xylophone, hand piano, long short and slit drums, pots, gongs, bamboo horn and calabash. There are dances for childbirth, marriage, funerals, communal labor, and other social occasions. The agbacha ekurunwa dance is performed for childbirth, and alija and ogbongelenge are performed for marriage. Eseike, esse, ekwerikwe mgba and nkwa Ike are performed at funerals of men, and uko and Ekereavu for funerals of women. D. I. Nwoga, who brought an abigbo group to the United States during the 1980s, wrote that the musicians and dancers philosophize, criticize, admonish and praise with their performances.

References

Sources and further reading
Agulanna, E. C. (2008). The Mbaiseness of Mbaise (2nd ed.) Owerri: Career Publishers.
Njoku, C. A. C (2003). History and Culture of Mbaise from Earliest Times to AD 2001. Owerri: Celaju Nig. Publishers.
Nwoga, D. I. (1978) "Culture and Religion in Contemporary Mbaise" in T. U. Nwala (ed.), Mbaise in Contemporary Nigeria. New York: Gold and Maestro.
Njoku, G. (1978) "Mbais in Pre-colonial and Colonial Nigeria" in T. U. Nwala (ed.), Mbaise in Contemporary Nigeria. New York: Gold & Maestro.
Achebe, Chinua. Things Fall Apart. New York: Anchor Books, 1994. 

Imo State
Communities in Igboland
Regions of Africa